is a 1985 Japanese comedy film written and directed by Juzo Itami, and starring Tsutomu Yamazaki, Nobuko Miyamoto, Kōji Yakusho, and Ken Watanabe. The publicity for the film calls it the first "ramen western", a play on the term Spaghetti Western (films about the American Old West made by Italian production studios).

Plot
A pair of truck drivers, the experienced Gorō and a younger sidekick named Gun, stop at a decrepit roadside ramen noodle shop. Outside, Gorō rescues a boy who is being beaten up by three schoolmates. The boy, Tabo, turns out to be the son of Tampopo, the widowed owner of the struggling business, Lai Lai. When a customer called Pisken harasses Tampopo, Gorō invites him and his men to step outside. Gorō puts up a good fight, but outnumbered by Pisken and his men, he is knocked out and wakes up the next morning in Tampopo's home.

When Tampopo asks their opinion of her noodles, Gorō and Gun tell her they are "sincere, but lack character." After Gorō gives her some advice, she asks him to become her teacher. They decide to turn her establishment into a paragon of the "art of noodle soup making". Gorō takes her around and points out the strengths and weaknesses of her competitors. She still cannot get the broth just right, so Gorō brings in the "old master" and his superlative expertise. When they rescue a wealthy elderly man from choking on his food, he lends her his chauffeur Shohei, who has a masterly way with noodles. Also, through clever trickery they pry ramen secrets from their competitors. During the transition, the group agrees to change the restaurant's name from "Lai Lai" to "Tampopo".

Pisken feels bad for being too drunk to tell his men to stay out of the fight, so he offers Gorō another chance one-on-one. After the rematch ends in a draw, Pisken reveals he is a contractor and offers to make over the shop's interior. Tampopo's latest effort still comes up short, so Pisken teaches her his own secret recipe. When the five men consume her latest creation down to the last drop, Tampopo knows she has won. (Tabo also triumphs, beating all three of his tormentors). As customers fill her newly redecorated shop, the men file out one by one.

The main narrative is interspersed with stories involving food on several levels. 
Other vignettes follow a lowly worker who upstages his superiors by displaying his vast culinary knowledge while ordering at a gourmet French restaurant; a housewife who rises from her deathbed to cook one last meal for her family; and a women's etiquette class on how to eat spaghetti properly. Another scene involves a supermarket clerk who has to deal with an aged woman obsessed with squeezing food. The clerk's scene segues into a restaurant involving an investment scam and the intended victim, who turns out to be a conman himself.

The primary subplot involves a young gangster in a white suit and his lover, who explore erotic ways to use food. In the end, the man is shot several times by an unknown assailant, to his lover's horror, but uses his last words to convey his secret recipe for sausages.

Throughout, the film puns off stereotypical American movie themes, characters, music and camera set-ups and shots.

Cast
 Tsutomu Yamazaki as Gorō
 Nobuko Miyamoto as Tampopo
 Kōji Yakusho as Man in White Suit
 Ken Watanabe as Gun
 Rikiya Yasuoka as Pisuken
 Kinzō Sakura as Shōhei
 Yoshi Katō as Noodle-making master
 Hideji Ōtaki as Rich Old Man
 Fukumi Kuroda as Man in White Suit's mistress
 Setsuko Shinoi as Old Man's mistress
 Yoriko Dōguchi as Pearl diver (Oyster girl)
 Masahiko Tsugawa as Supermarket manager
 Yoshihiro Katō as Man in White Suit's henchman
 Mariko Okada as Spaghetti sensei
 Ryūtarō Ōtomo as Ramen master
 Toshiya Fujita as Man with Toothache (un-credited)

Release
A road show release of Tampopo was distributed by Toho on November 23, 1985. The film was released by New Yorker Films in the United States in 1987.

The Criterion Collection prepared a 4K restoration of Tampopo that was released in theatres in October 2016.

Reception

Critical response 
Roger Ebert gave the film four out of four stars, commenting that "Like the French comedies of Jacques Tati, it's a bemused meditation on human nature in which one humorous situation flows into another offhandedly, as if life were a series of smiles."

Hal Hinson of The Washington Post wrote, "The movie, which Itami calls a 'noodle western,' is a rambunctious mixture of the bawdy and the sublime." "'Tampopo' is perhaps the funniest movie about the connection between food and sex ever made."

Andrew Johnston writing in Time Out New York commented: "This film is his broadest comedy by far, and its principal subjects are those great global constants, food and sex. That, combined with the plot's sly evocation of movie Westerns, made it widely accessible to foreign audiences."

Vincent Canby provided a somewhat dissenting, though still positive, opinion in his New York Times review, stating, "Though it's not consistently funny… 'Tampopo' is one of the more engaging films to be shown in this year's [New Directors/New Films] series." "Mr. Itami often strains after comic effects that remain elusive. The most appealing thing about 'Tampopo' is that he never stops trying."

Tampopo has received unanimous praise from critics, with a 100% approval rating and average score of 8.53/10 from Rotten Tomatoes, based on 52 reviews. The site's critical consensus states, "Thanks to director Juzo Itami's offbeat humor and sharp satirical edge, Tampopo is a funny, sexy, affectionate celebration of food and its broad influence on Japanese culture."

Accolades 
Tampopo received two Japanese Academy Awards for Best Editing and Best Sound. In the United States, it was nominated for an Independent Spirit Award for Best Foreign Film and a National Society of Film Critics Award, USA for Best Screenplay and Best Director.

Legacy

The 2008 American/Japanese movie The Ramen Girl, in which a girl played by Brittany Murphy learns how to make ramen, contains many references to Tampopo, including a cameo by Tsutomu Yamazaki.

A number of ramen restaurants around the world have been named Tampopo.

References

Bibliography

Further reading
 Ashkenazi, Michael. "Food, Play, Business, and the Image of Japan in Itami Juzo's Tampopo". In Anne Bower, ed., Reel Food: Essays on Food and Film (New York: Routledge, 2004).

External links
 
 
 
 Tampopo  at the Japanese Movie Database
 Tampopo: Ramen for the People an essay by Willie Blackmore at the Criterion Collection

1985 films
1985 comedy films
1980s sex comedy films
1980s Japanese-language films
Japanese sex comedy films
Japanese satirical films
Cooking films
Films about food and drink
Films directed by Jūzō Itami
Films set in Tokyo
Films set in restaurants
Yakuza films
1980s Japanese films